Yaqay (Yaqai, Jakai, Jaqai) is a Papuan language spoken in Indonesia by over 10,000 people. It is also called Mapi or Sohur; dialects are Oba-Miwamon, Nambiomon-Mabur, Bapai.

According to Ethnologue, Yaqay is spoken along the south coast of Mappi Regency, along the Obaa River north to the Gandaimu area.

References

Kriens, Ron and Randy Lebold. 2010. Report on the Wildeman River Survey in Papua, Indonesia. SIL International.

External links 
Yakhai. New Guinea World.

Marind–Yaqai languages
Languages of Indonesia